Kihnspiracy is a studio album by the Greg Kihn Band, released in 1983 by Beserkley Records. The album features the hit single "Jeopardy", the band's only top 10 hit on the Billboard Hot 100 singles chart. It reached number 2 in May 1983, beneath Michael Jackson's "Beat It". A parody of the song, "I Lost on Jeopardy", was released by "Weird Al" Yankovic in 1984.

The album marks the group's first line-up change since 1975, with Greg Douglass taking over as lead guitar player after the departure of Dave Carpender.

Track listing

Charts

Personnel
The Greg Kihn Band
Greg Kihn
Greg Douglass
Larry Lynch
Gary Phillips
Steve Wright

Technical
Matthew King Kaufman – producer
Dr. Schnoz – engineer
Gary Hobish – assistant engineer
Don Cody – additional engineering
George Horn – mastering
Tina Nielsen – title concept
Marsha Necheles – title concept
Ron Coro – art direction
Mike Fink – art, design
Phil Bray – photography

References

1983 albums
Greg Kihn albums
Beserkley Records albums